Winger is the debut studio album by American rock band Winger. The album was released through Atlantic Records in 1988 and was produced by Beau Hill.

Background
The music was radio-friendly, but with a progressive twist. The lyrics, however, were typical of the age and genre.

The name "Sahara" appears in the lower right hand section of the album cover. The band initially wanted to call themselves "Sahara", but that name was taken by another band at the time. Though they ultimately chose the name Winger, "Sahara" remained on the cover.

A number of radio and video hits were extracted from the album, including "Headed for a Heartbreak" and "Seventeen", peaking at No. 19 and No. 26 at the Billboards single chart. On February 11, 1989, the album peaked at number 21 on the Billboard 200, and after that stayed on the chart for 63 weeks. It achieved platinum status in the United States and went gold in Canada and Japan.

In support of the album, Winger toured for over a year with bands like Bad Company, Scorpions, Cinderella, Bon Jovi, Poison, Skid Row and Tesla.

Promotional videos were shot for the four singles "Madalaine", "Seventeen", "Headed for a Heartbreak" and "Hungry".

Track listing

Personnel 
Credits are adapted from the album's liner notes.

 Winger
 Kip Winger – bass, lead vocals, keyboards, string arrangements
 Reb Beach – guitars, backing vocals
 Paul Taylor – keyboards, backing vocals
 Rod Morgenstein – drums, backing vocals

 Additional personnel
 Dweezil Zappa – left side guitar solo on "Purple Haze"
 Beau Hill, Ira McLaughlin – additional vocals
 Sandra Park, Rebecca Young, Hae Young Ham, Maria Kitsopoulos – strings

 Production
 Beau Hill – producer, engineer
 Noah Baron, Jimmy Hoyson – assistant engineers
 Bob Schwall, Bob Caputo – technicians
 Stephen Benben – digital editing
 Ted Jensen – mastering at Sterling Sound, New York
 Brad Miskel, Ron Feddor – additional input
 Dan Hubp – cover art and design
 Steven Selikoff – photography

Charts

Certifications

See also
List of glam metal albums and songs

References 

1988 debut albums
Winger (band) albums
Albums produced by Beau Hill
Atlantic Records albums